Hermann Schridde (3 July 1937, in Celle – 18 May 1985 in Meißendorf, near Winsen) was a German equestrian. Schridde won the German show jumping championship in 1960.

Schridde was a show jumper at the 1964 Summer Olympics for the United Team of Germany. He won a gold medal in the team event and a silver medal in the individual event. In 1965, he won the European Show Jumping Championships in Aachen riding Dozent. At the 1968 Summer Olympics, he won a bronze medal in the team event, riding for West Germany. He qualified for West Germany for the 1972 Summer Olympics, but withdrew, and founded a private school for parachutists in Meißendorf.

He was appointed German federal show jumping trainer in 1980, and held the post until his death from an aircraft crash in 1985.

References

1937 births
1985 deaths
Olympic equestrians of West Germany
German male equestrians
Olympic equestrians of the United Team of Germany
Equestrians at the 1964 Summer Olympics
Equestrians at the 1968 Summer Olympics
Olympic gold medalists for the United Team of Germany
Olympic silver medalists for the United Team of Germany
Olympic bronze medalists for West Germany
People from Celle
Victims of aviation accidents or incidents in Germany
Olympic medalists in equestrian
Medalists at the 1968 Summer Olympics
Medalists at the 1964 Summer Olympics
Victims of aviation accidents or incidents in 1985
Sportspeople from Lower Saxony